DMSO is dimethyl sulfoxide, an organosulfur compound with the formula (CH3)2SO.

DMSO may also refer to:

 Deuterated DMSO, an isotopologue of dimethyl sulfoxide used as a solvent in Nuclear Magnetic Resonance spectroscopy.
 Defense Modeling and Simulation Office, the former name of the Modeling and Simulation Coordination Office in the U.S. Department of Defense
 Des Moines Symphony Orchestra, in Des Moines, Iowa, United States
 Driving Motor Standard Open, a type of rail vehicle found in British multiple unit trains such as the British Rail Class 315
 "D.M.S.O.", a song by Dead Kennedys from the album Bedtime For Democracy